Jagdal may refer to:

 Jagdal Union, in Bangladesh
 Jagdal, variant form of Jadgal